Surcubamba District is one of sixteen districts of the Tayacaja Province in Peru.

Geography 
Other mountains are listed below:

The largest lake of the district is Warmi Qucha ("woman's lake").

Ethnic groups 
The people in the district are mainly Indigenous citizens of Quechua descent. Quechua is the language which the majority of the population (89.61%) learnt to speak in childhood, 9.99% of the residents started speaking using the Spanish language (2007 Peru Census).

References